The Booroola is a Merino strain that has a high rate of multiple births.

Booroola's prolificacy was studied extensively by New Zealand researchers, who provided one of the first examples of the practical application of gene mapping in sheep, by mapping the Booroola gene to chromosome 6
.

History
The Booroola Merino was started by Jack and Dick Seears of Booroola, Cooma using ewes from their Egelabra flock that gave multiple-births. The Seears gave the CSIRO a quintuplet ram in 1958, another in 1959 and a sextuplet ewe in 1960. In 1958, the CSIRO purchased 12 ewes (triplets or quadruplets) and a ewe who had given birth to triplets. When the Booroola flock was dispersed in 1965, the CSIRO purchased 91 mixed-age multiple-born ewes and moved their Booroola flock from Deniliquin to Armidale. 

The Egelabra and Mumblebone strains of the Merino can be traced to Gamboola; these were derived from Samuel Marsden's flock, and like Macarther's flock, Marsden's flock was based on South African Escurial, Cape and Bengal Sheep. The Bengal was a prolific sheep imported from Calcutta.

Notes

References

Further reading
DNA Tests in Prolific Sheep from Eight Countries Provide New Evidence on Origin of the Booroola (FecB) Mutation

Sheep breeds originating in Australia
Sheep breeds